Juan José Navarro Guerra (born 8 March 1991) is a Spanish footballer who plays for SD Ejea as a central midfielder.

Club career
Born in Seville, Andalusia, Guerra finished his graduation with local Sevilla FC, making his senior debuts with the C-team in the 2009–10 season, in Tercera División. After one and a half seasons he was promoted to the reserves in Segunda División B.

On 16 July 2012 Guerra signed with another reserve team, Córdoba CF B. On 24 November of the following year he made his first-team debut, playing the last 12 minutes of a 1–3 away loss against CD Mirandés in the Segunda División.

References

External links

1991 births
Living people
Spanish footballers
Footballers from Seville
Association football midfielders
Segunda División players
Segunda División B players
Tercera División players
Sevilla FC C players
Sevilla Atlético players
Córdoba CF B players
Córdoba CF players
Écija Balompié players
CD Alcalá players
Spain youth international footballers